Bradford Academy might refer to:

Former name of Bradford College (United States)
Current name of Bradford Academy, West Yorkshire